John Lunn (1946–1973) was a Scottish professional footballer, who played as a left-back for Dunfermline Athletic. Lunn helped Dunfermline win the 1967–68 Scottish Cup. He later suffered from leukemia and died in 1973.

References

1946 births
1973 deaths
Date of death missing
Place of death missing
Scottish footballers
Association football fullbacks
Dunfermline Athletic F.C. players
Scottish Football League players
Footballers from Fife
Deaths from leukemia
Deaths from cancer in Scotland
Scottish Junior Football Association players
Blairhall Colliery F.C. players